The year 573 BC was a year of the pre-Julian Roman calendar. In the Roman Empire, it was known as year 181 Ab urbe condita. The denomination 573 BC for this year has been used since the early medieval period, when the Anno Domini calendar era became the prevalent method in Europe for naming years.

Events
 The Nemean Games are founded at Nemea, Greece. (traditional date)

Births

Deaths
 Duke Li of Jin, ruler of the State of Jin

References